Nayagaon railway station, (Station code: NYO), is a railway station in Sonpur Block in Saran district in the Indian state of Bihar. One siding Railway line from Rail Wheel Plant, Bela plant site to Nayagaon station is under construction.

Trains
Nayagaon falls under the jurisdiction of Sonpur railway division. Major trains pass through Nayagaon railway station(NYO):
 Lichchavi Express (Train no. 14006 / 05)
 Bagh Express (Train no. 13020)
 Sealdah Ballia Express (Train no 13106)
Trains between Nayagaon and Patliputra:
 Gorakhpur–Patliputra Passenger (Train no. 55008)
 Patliputra Gorakhpur Passenger (Train no. 55007)

Route between Nayagaon and Digha Bridge Halt: pathGoogle location

Trains running on Digha–Sonpur rail–road bridge between Sonpur and Patliputra are:
 Raxaul–Hajipur Intercity Express (Train no. 15202)
 Gorakhpur–Patliputra Passenger (Train no. 55042)
 Sonepur–Gorakhpur Passenger (Train no.55209)
 Patliputra–Barauni DEMU (Train no. 75216)
 Patliputra–Narkatiaganj Intercity (Train no. 25201)

Train Time Table
The following is the sortable table of all the trains passing from  Nayagaon Railway Station (Updated on 4 May 2017).

Gallery

Nearest Railway Station

The distance from nearby stations are:

Facilities
The major facilities available are Waiting rooms, retiring room

Platforms
There are 3 platforms at Nayagaon railway station. The platforms are interconnected with three foot overbridge (FOB).

References

External links
 Nayagaon rail station design 
 NYO in SEE

Sonpur railway division
Railway stations in Saran district